Acer platanoides 'Pendulum', or weeping Norway maple, is a weeping tree and a cultivar of Acer platanoides, the Norway maple. It was first found by Niemetz at  Timișoara, Romania in 1901. No trees are known to survive of this cultivar.

Description
A weeping tree without a leader and with perpendicular branches forming an umbrella shape.

Accessions
This cultivar does not seem to have been cultivated outside Romania. It was cultivated at the Bazos Arboretum where the last known specimen died in the year 2000.

Synonymy
Acer platanoides var. pendulum Niemetz (1901)

References

platanoides Pendulum
Weeping trees
Extinct cultivars